Philipp Heithölter (born 28 August 1982) is a German retired footballer who played as a left midfielder.

Career
Heithölter grew up in Herford, where he played for SV Sundern 08 and SC Herford. After one season in the Oberliga Westfalen (IV) with Fichte Bielefeld, he joined then second division club Arminia Bielefeld and appeared in four matches in the 2003–04 season. The following year he played 19 matches for Armenia's second team in the Oberliga. Heithölter has then played for Holstein Kiel and moved after two years to Rot Weiss Ahlen before he signed with SC Paderborn 07 on 15 June 2009.

References

External links
 

1982 births
Living people
People from Herford
Sportspeople from Detmold (region)
German footballers
Arminia Bielefeld players
Holstein Kiel players
Rot Weiss Ahlen players
SC Paderborn 07 players
2. Bundesliga players
3. Liga players
Association football midfielders
Footballers from North Rhine-Westphalia